Incitement is a 2019 Israeli thriller film directed by Yaron Zilberman. It was screened in the Contemporary World Cinema section at the 2019 Toronto International Film Festival. The film was written by Ron Leshem alongside Zilberman, and Yair Hizmi. At the film's world premiere at the Toronto International Film Festival, the screening was halted and the audience had to evacuate because of a security threat. The screening resumed when the cinema showing the film was determined to be safe. It received the 2019 Ophir Award for Best Picture and was selected as the Israeli entry for the Best International Feature Film at the 92nd Academy Awards.

Plot
A profile of Yigal Amir in the year leading up to his assassination of Yitzhak Rabin.

Cast
 Yehuda Nahari Halevi as Yigal Amir
 Amitai Yaish as Shlomo Amir
 Anat Ravnitzki as Geula Amir
 Yoav Levi as Hagai Amir
 Daniella Kertesz as Nava
 Sivan Mast as Margalit Har-Shefi
 Dolev Ohana as Dror Adani

See also
 List of submissions to the 92nd Academy Awards for Best International Feature Film
 List of Israeli submissions for the Academy Award for Best International Feature Film

References

External links
 
 
 

2019 films
2019 thriller films
Assassination of Yitzhak Rabin
Films about assassinations
2010s Hebrew-language films
Israeli thriller films